Gabriel Popescu may refer to:

 Gabriel Popescu (footballer) (born 1973), Romanian footballer
 Gabriel Popescu (scientist) (1971—2022), Romanian-American scientist

See also
 Gabriel–Popescu theorem